AN/PRC 77 Radio Set is a manpack, portable VHF FM combat-net radio transceiver manufactured by Associated Industries and used to provide short-range, two-way radiotelephone voice communication. In the Joint Electronics Type Designation System (JETDS), AN/PRC translates to "Army/Navy, Portable, Radio, Communication."

History 
The AN/PRC-77 entered service in 1968 during the Vietnam War as an upgrade to the earlier AN/PRC-25. It differs from its predecessor mainly in that the PRC-77's final power amplifier stage is made with a transistor, eliminating the only vacuum tube in the PRC-25 and the DC-DC voltage converter used to create the high plate voltage for the tube from the 15 V battery. These were not the only changes. The PRC-77 transmitter audio bandwidth was widened to give it the ability to use voice encryption devices, while the PRC-25 could not. These include the TSEC/KY-38 NESTOR equipment used in Vietnam and the later KY-57 VINSON family. Problems were encountered in Vietnam with the combination as described in the NESTOR article. The transmitter spurious  emissions were cleaned up to create less interference to nearby receivers. The receiver's performance was also hardened in the PRC-77 to enable it to better reject interference suffered from nearby transmitters, a common operating set up that reduced the effectiveness of the PRC-25.  The receiver audio bandwidth was also increased to operate with the encryption equipment.

There were no changes to the external controls or looks, so the two radios looked and the operating controls were the same. The equipment tag glued to the edge of the front panel being the only (external) way to tell the difference.  The original batteries had a 3 V tap (series diode-reduced to 2.4 V) for the PRC-25's tube filament. This remained unchanged so the batteries could operate either radio it was placed in, but the PRC-77 did not use the 3 V tap at all.  With the more efficient all-transistorized circuitry, and without the DC-DC step-up voltage converter for the tube, the common battery lasted longer in the PRC-77 under the same conditions.  "OF THE TWENTY-FIVE (25) ELECTRONIC MODULES ORIGINALLY USED IN BOTH THE TRANSMITTER AND RECEIVER PORTIONS OF THE AN/PRC-25, ONLY EIGHT (8) OF THE MODULES USED IN THE AN/PRC-77 ARE INTERCHANGEABLE WITH THE AN/PRC-25.'"  

Today the AN/PRC-77 has largely been replaced by SINCGARS radios, but it is still capable of inter-operating with most VHF FM radios used by U.S. and allied ground forces. It was commonly nicknamed the "prick-77" by U.S. military forces.

Technical details 
The AN/PRC 77 consists of the RT-841 transceiver and minor components. It can provide secure voice (X-mode) transmission with the TSEC/KY-57 VINSON voice encryption device, but is not compatible with the SINCGARS frequency hopping mode. During the Vietnam War, the PRC-77 used the earlier TSEC/KY-38 NESTOR voice encryption system.

Major components:

Transmitter/Receiver unit
Battery

Minor components - CES (Complete Equipment Schedule):

3 ft antenna - 'bush/battle whip'
10 ft antenna
3 ft antenna base - 'gooseneck'
10 ft antenna base
Handset
Harness

Users 

: The Austrian Army still uses the AN/PRC-77, though in a limited capacity such as training cadets in radio communications. For border patrol the Austrian Army now uses a new device called "TFF-41" (Pentacom RT-405), which is capable of frequency-hopping and digital encryption. The Austrian Army also uses the AN/PRC-1177 for example the Austrian AN/PRC-77 have a special switch for a 25 kHz mode, which reduces the bandwidth of the selected channel by 25 kHz and therefore doubles the number of available channels.
: The Bangladesh Army use the AN/PRC-77 as a section level communication equipment. In Chittagong Hill Tracts area it is still used for operations. Some modified/improvised local antenna concepts often increase the communication range up to 15–20 km. Now being phased out by far superior Q-MAC's VHF-90M
: In Brazil it is used by Brazilian Army It was nicknamed EB-11 RY-20/ERC-110 manufactured by Associated Industries U.S.A and manufactured by AEG Telefunken do Brasil S/A, São Paulo 1970 the radio is used today but is now being replaced but still the PRC-77 remains stored in military units also used for training of technicians in military communications sergeants communications.
: The Telecomm Regiments in the Chilean Army still using the PRC - 77. (In process of modernization).
: Salvadoran military and security forces used both American and Israeli-manufactured versions during the civil war.
: The Finnish army uses this radio as a "battalion radio", using it as a common training device.  The radio is designated LV 217 'Ventti-seiska' ('ventti' is Finnish slang for '21', from the Finnish variant of blackjack).
: The Israel Defense Forces used this radio extensively from the early 1970s to the late 1990s, when it was gradually replaced by modern digital devices. However, it can still be found in some units, mostly in stationary temporary posts.
: The New Zealand Defence Force used the '77 set' as its VHF combat arms communications equipment, both manpack and vehicle-mounted Land Rover 'fitted for radio' (FFR) variants, from the late 1960s until the 1990s. It came into New Zealand service with a lot of other US equipment during New Zealand's contribution to the Vietnam War, replacing the New Zealand-built ZC-1 and British equipment dating back to the Second World War. 
: The AN/PRC-77 has been replaced as a main source of radio communication for regular forces of the Norwegian Army by indigenously developed radio sets called MRR (Multi Role Radio) and LFR (Lett Flerbruks Radio) (Norwegian for Light Multi Role Radio), and other modern radios. However the Norwegian Army did not throw these radio sets away. Instead many of them were handed over to the Home Guard which still uses it as their backup radio as there is a limited supply of MRR sets for the force totalling 40 000 soldiers.
: The Pakistani Army has used the set for the past 25+ years. Purchased from different sources including the US, Brazil and Spain, it is scheduled to be replaced in the next 5 years.
: The Philippine Army made extensive use of the AN/PRC-77 for several decades until they were phased out of service with the introduction of newer manpack radios such as the Harris Falcon II during the 2000s.
: The Spanish Army, Spanish Navy (Armada Española), Spanish Marines and Spanish Air Force formerly used the AN/PRC-77. It was replaced by the French PR4G since 2002
: In the Swedish Army the radio system goes under the name Radio 145 and Radio 146 (Ra145/146), predominately the Homeguard (National Guard) is issued the Ra145/146.
: The Swiss Army used the radio as SE-227.
: The Republic of China (Taiwan) Army nicknamed the radio as "77", and had used it for over 40 years when AN/PRC-77, along with AN/VRC-12, were replaced by indigenous radio systems in 2010s.

Photo gallery

See also
 List of military electronics of the United States

References

External links

AN/PRC-25 and AN/PRC-77 at Olive-drab.com
PRC-77 Back Pack Squad Radio

Military radio systems of the United States
Military electronics of the United States
Military equipment of the Vietnam War
Military equipment introduced in the 1960s